Ahmet Kural (born 10 November 1982) is a Turkish actor.

Early life and career 
Ahmet Kural was born on 10 November 1982 in Kütahya. His father, a chief constable, was working in the city at the time. Due to the influence of his elder sister who was studying acting, Kural decided to become an actor and started working in the theater at high school. He finished radio, television and cinema studies at Selçuk University and took his master's from Bilkent University. He also took acting lessons at the Müjdat Gezen Arts Center.

While continuing his education, he joined the Levent Kırca-Oya Başar Tiyatrosu theater. While his theater studies were continuing, he began to appear on television with his roles in the series Fikrimin İnce Gülü and the TRT series Evimin Erkeği. Later he began to play the leading role in the series Gazi, but due to low ratings, the series was finished after the 19th episode. At the same year, he was cast in the movie Güneşin Oğlu alongside Haluk Bilginer, Köksal Engür, Hümeyra and Özgü Namal. He then appeared in one episode of Ramazan Güzeldir.

In 2010, together with Murat Cemcir, he played a main role in Selçuk Aydemir's movie Çalgı Çengi. On 28 June 2012, his hit comedy series İşler Güçler started airing on Star TV in which he shared the leading roles with Murat Cemcir and Sadi Celil Cengiz. Since the hit comedy series "Kardeş Payı", he and Murat Cemcir continue to play in comedy films and series together.

Controversies

Violence against women 
From time to time, Kural's name has appeared in the media in relation to his acts of violence against women. In September 2014, he broke the finger of his friend, Naz Çekem. In November 2018, singer Sıla accused Kural of physical and psychological violence. In accordance with law, the court issued a restraining order and ordered Kural to stay away from Sıla for three months. Kural denied the allegation that he used violence against Sıla at first, saying that he "only grabbed her arm", but later explained that there was a "scuffle" between them. In the lawsuit filed, it was demanded that he'd be sentenced to 1 year, 4 months and 20 days in prison. Kural's retrial began on 19 February 2021, with the prosecutor seeking up to 5 years in prison for him.

Drunk driving accident 
In February 2020, Kural was involved in a chain reaction car crash with two other cars during which a person got injured. Kural was found to have a blood alcohol level of 1.85 per mille at the time of the accident. He was fined and his driver's license was suspended by the police for six months.

Filmography

References

External links
 

1982 births
21st-century Turkish male actors
Turkish male television actors
People from Kütahya
Living people